Flori is a surname and given name. Notable people with the name include:

Given name 
Flori Lang (born 1983), Swiss sprinter swimmer
Flori (born 1993), Grand Master
Flori van Acker (1858–1940), Belgian painter, engraver and stamp designer

Surname 
Jean Flori (1936–2018), French medieval historian
Sebastiano Flori (active 1545), Italian painter

See also 
Dr. Flori (1979–2014),  born as Florian Kondi, was an Albanian recording artist, singer-songwriter and rapper
Flori sacre, is the title of a 1912 collection of poetry by Romanian poet Alexandru Macedonski
Malu cu Flori, is a commune in Dâmbovița County, southern Romania
Thaumastus flori, is a species of tropical air-breathing land snail, a pulmonate gastropod mollusk in the family Megaspiridae